This is a list of notable events in music that took place in the year 1980.


Specific locations
1980 in British music
1980 in Norwegian music

Specific genres
1980 in country music
1980 in heavy metal music
1980 in hip hop music
1980 in jazz

Events

January–March
January 1
Cliff Richard is appointed an MBE by Queen Elizabeth II of the United Kingdom.
The Zorros audition drummer Greg Pedley.
January 5 – Donna Summer Brings her 3 double album in a 14-month period, to the top of the Billboard Albums charts; when Greatest Hits: On the Radio; Vol 1 & 2; reaches the top spot.
January 7 – At the age of 44, songwriter Larry Williams is found dead in his Los Angeles, California, home of a gunshot wound to the head. Investigators are never able to determine whether his death was a murder or suicide.
January 13 – The Beach Boys, Grateful Dead, and Jefferson Starship perform at a benefit concert at Oakland Coliseum for the people of Kampuchea.
January 14 – Rush release Permanent Waves, which eventually becomes the band's fifth platinum album.
January 16 – Paul McCartney is arrested in Tokyo for possession of a half pound of marijuana. The remaining part of McCartney's and Wings' tour was then canceled.
January 19 – The first UK Indie Chart is published in Record Week, with Spizzenergi's "Where's Captain Kirk" topping the singles chart, and Adam and the Ants' Dirk Wears White Sox topping the album chart.
January 25 – Paul McCartney is released from a Japanese jail and ejected from the country by Japanese authorities.
February 7 – Pink Floyd's The Wall Tour opens at the Los Angeles Memorial Sports Arena.
February 8 – David Bowie and his wife of nearly 10 years, Angie, file for divorce. Bowie gets custody of their 9-year-old son, Zowie.
February 14 – Lou Reed marries Sylvia Morales in New York City's Greenwich Village.
February 19 – Bon Scott, lead singer of AC/DC, dies in London. Although common folklore cites pulmonary aspiration of vomit as the cause of his death, the official cause is listed as "Acute alcohol poisoning" and "Death by Misadventure".
February 23 – Ron Wood of the Rolling Stones and his wife are arrested for cocaine possession on the Caribbean island of Saint Martin. They are set free after spending five days in custody due to the inability of authorities to prove the cocaine in the apartment belonged to either of them.
February 27 – The 22nd Annual Grammy Awards are presented in Los Angeles, hosted by Kenny Rogers. Billy Joel's 52nd Street wins Album of the Year, while the Doobie Brothers' "What a Fool Believes" wins both Record of the Year and Song of the Year. Rickie Lee Jones wins Best New Artist.
February 29 – Buddy Holly's trademark glasses and the Big Bopper's wristwatch are "rediscovered" in old police files by the Mason City, Iowa, sheriff (both were killed in a plane crash on February 3, 1959, along with singer Ritchie Valens).
March 1 – Patti Smith marries former MC5 member Fred "Sonic" Smith.
March 3 – Sotheby's auction house in London auctions off a Rivera Hotel, Las Vegas, napkin signed by Elvis Presley for £500. Other items auctioned included four American dollar bills autographed by the Beatles, for £220 and a collection of personal letters belonging to the Rolling Stones, also for £220.
March 8–16 – Tbilisi Rock Festival (1980): the first state-sanctioned rock music festival in the Soviet Union.
March 14 – Record producer Quincy Jones receives a star on the Hollywood Walk of Fame.
March 19 – Elvis Presley's autopsy was subpoenaed during the trial of Dr. George Nichopoulous, who would later be found guilty of over-prescribing drugs to Presley, Jerry Lee Lewis and other clients.
March 20 – Radio Caroline shuts down in the UK after radio ship Mi Amigo sinks in a storm.

April–June
April 1 – Brian Johnson is made the new lead singer of AC/DC replacing the late Bon Scott.
April 5 – R.E.M. Lead vocalist Michael Stipe, guitarist Peter Buck,  drummer Bill Berry and bassist Mike Mills played their first show.
April 13 – The Broadway musical Grease closes its run of 3,388 performances, making it the longest running show on Broadway up until that time.
April 14 
A member of the New Jersey State assembly introduces a resolution to make Bruce Springsteen's "Born to Run" the official state song.
Iron Maiden release their self-titled debut album. 
April 17 – As the "official guests of State", Bob Marley and the Wailers perform at Zimbabwe's Independence festival. Marley calls the event the "greatest honor of my life."
April 19
Johnny Logan wins the 25th Eurovision Song Contest for Ireland,  with the song "What's Another Year".
R.E.M. performs their first performance under the name R.E.M. 
April 25 – Black Sabbath release Heaven and Hell, their first album to feature Ronnie James Dio on vocals.
April 30 – The Roger Daltrey film, McVicar, opens in London.
May 4 – America's Top 10, the television version of radio's American Top 40 and hosted by Casey Kasem, debuts this week in syndication.
May 18 – Ian Curtis, vocalist of pioneering post-punk group Joy Division, hangs himself in his Macclesfield home, just one day before Joy Division are scheduled to begin their first U.S. tour.
June 25
Rock and Roll pioneer Bill Haley performs for the last time during a tour of South Africa. After this tour, his health deteriorates and he dies in February 1981. July 1980 marks the 25th anniversary of Haley's "Rock Around the Clock" reaching No. 1 on the American singles charts.
The Sony Walkman goes on sale in the United States.
Kiss plays its first show with new drummer Eric Carr at the New York Palladium.
June 27 – John Lydon and Keith Levene of Public Image Ltd make an appearance on The Tomorrow Show with host Tom Snyder. In a famously uncomfortable interview, Lydon gives curt and vague responses to most of Snyder's questions.

July–September
July 11 – Ultravox release their fourth studio album, Vienna. Their first album with new lead singer Midge Ure following the departures of frontman John Foxx and guitarist Robin Simon, Vienna marks a radical shift in Ultravox's direction and image, transforming the former post-punk band into a more sophisticatedly-oriented new wave/synthpop group. Despite this stylistic shift alienating fans and critics who were more favorable towards the Foxx-led incarnation of the band, Vienna would go on to become Ultravox's most successful studio album to date.
July 18 – The documentary and concert film No Nukes opens in New York.
July 25 – Over five months after the death of lead singer Bon Scott, AC/DC release Back in Black, their first album with replacement singer Brian Johnson, who would remain with the band until 2016. The album's success would lead it to become the second-highest-selling album of all time and the highest-selling studio album by any band to date.
July 29 – Over two months after the suicide of lead singer Ian Curtis, the surviving members of Joy Division regroup as a new band and debut anonymously live at Manchester's Beach Club; the group would adopt the moniker "New Order" the following year.
July 31 – The Eagles end their tour with a contentious show in Long Beach, California. They would not play together again until 1994.
August 4 – John Lennon and Yoko Ono begin the recording of the Double Fantasy album.
August 16 
The first Monsters of Rock heavy metal festival is held at Donington Park in England. Rainbow headlines, and Judas Priest, Scorpions, April Wine, Saxon, Riot and Touch also perform.
Several bands lose members in one day; bass player Jah Wobble leaves Public Image, Ltd.; keyboard player Jools Holland leaves Squeeze; and drummers Bill Ward and Cozy Powell leave Black Sabbath and Rainbow respectively.
August 19 – Fans at Exhibition Stadium in Toronto stage a riot after Alice Cooper cancels because of illness.
August 23 – The Heatwave festival near Toronto features The B-52's, Talking Heads, The Pretenders, Elvis Costello and many others.
August 26 – Pete Comita replaces Tom Petersson in Cheap Trick.
August 31 – Karen Carpenter marries Thomas Burris. "Because We Are in Love" is played at their wedding.
September 13
Solid Gold, a new music television series, premieres in syndication.
Elton John plays a free concert for 400,000 people in New York's Central Park. He performs the encore in a Donald Duck costume.
Gary Numan earns his third consecutive number 1 on the UK Albums Chart in less than fourteen months as Telekon enters the chart at number 1.
September 25 – John Bonham, drummer of Led Zeppelin, is found dead by bandmate John Paul Jones.

October–December
October 9 – A riot breaks out at a Black Sabbath concert in Milwaukee after bassist Geezer Butler is hit in the head by a bottle and the band quits the stage.
October 26 – Paul Kantner of Jefferson Starship is rushed to hospital following a cerebral hemorrhage. He soon recovers without surgery, defying medical odds.
October – Iron Maiden replaces guitarist Dennis Stratton with Urchin guitarist Adrian Smith.
November 21 
The Eagles' Don Henley is arrested when cocaine, Quaaludes, and marijuana are found in his hotel room after a 16-year-old prostitute has drug-related seizures. Henley is also subsequently charged with contributing to the delinquency of a minor.  After pleading no contest, he was fined $2,500 and put on two years' probation.
Iron Maiden play their first gig with new guitarist Adrian Smith in Uxbridge, London, England.
December 4  – Led Zeppelin disbands following the death of drummer John Bonham.
December 5  – Duran Duran signs with EMI after finalizing its lineup and touring as a support act for Hazel O'Connor.
December 7 – Darby Crash, leader of seminal L.A. punk band the Germs, dies of a heroin overdose in a suicide pact.
December 8 – John Lennon is shot to death outside his apartment building in New York City at 10:50 pm.  Lennon's single, "(Just Like) Starting Over", subsequently becomes a number one hit in many countries, including the United States, United Kingdom and Australia.
December 14 – Over 100,000 mourners attend a public vigil for John Lennon in Central Park, New York. 10 minutes of silence are observed at 2pm.
December 31 – The ninth annual New Year's Rockin' Eve special airs on ABC, with appearances by The Charlie Daniels Band, Billy Preston, Syreeta, Chuck Berry and Barry Manilow.

Also in 1980

The Roland Corporation releases the Roland TR-808 drum machine, which became a cornerstone of the emerging electronic, dance, and hip hop genres. The machine went on to become one of the most influential instruments in popular music, comparable to the Fender Stratocaster's influence on rock.
Record labels established in 1980
Record labels disestablished in 1980
The single "Groovy Ghost Show" by Casper is one of the first recorded hip hop songs from Chicago.
British comedy group The Hee Bee Gee Bees release "Meaningless Songs (in Very High Voices)", a parody of a Bee Gees' disco-style single. Though not a hit in the UK, it is a huge success elsewhere, especially in South Africa, and helps to encourage the Gibb brothers to diversify stylistically.
Phil Collins signs a contract with Atlantic Records to distribute his solo records in the US and in Europe outside the UK (on WEA label).

Bands formed
See :Category:Musical groups established in 1980

Bands disbanded
See :Category:Musical groups disestablished in 1980

Albums released

January

February

March

April

May

June

July

August

September

October

November

December

Release date unknown

 80/81 – Pat Metheny
 100 M.P.H. – Vardis
 1980 – Gil Scott Heron
 Acnalbasac Noom – Slapp Happy
 Alone Together – Clare Fischer
 Another String of Hits – The Shadows
 Army Life – The Exploited
 Authority Stealing – Fela Kuti
 Autumn – George Winston
 Baby's Got a Gun – The Only Ones
 The Beginning – Midnight Star
 Between a Hard Place and the Ground – Mike Bloomfield
 Blue Angel – Blue Angel
 The Brains – The Brains
 Breaking Glass – Hazel O'Connor – Soundtrack
 Brother Ray is at it Again – Ray Charles
 Bunny Wailer Sings the Wailers – Bunny Wailer
 Butcher Baby (EP) – Plasmatics
 Camellia III and Camellia IV – Ebiet G. Ade
 Carnaval – Spyro Gyra
 Caught You – Steel Pulse
 Cognac & Bologna – Doug and the Slugs
 Colours (Resurrection Band album) – Resurrection Band
 Crash and Burn – Pat Travers Band
 Chas Jankel – Chaz Jankel
 A Decade of Rock and Roll 1970 to 1980 – REO Speedwagon – Compilation
 Dome 1 – Dome
 Drastic Measures – 7 Seconds – cassette
 Dub Disco – Bunny Wailer
 East – Cold Chisel
 Eje Nlogba – King Sunny Ade
 Empire Strikes Back Soundtrack – John Williams – Soundtrack
 Exploited Barmy Army – The Exploited
 The First, the Best and the Last – Sham 69
 Framed – Asleep at the Wheel
 Gap Band III – The Gap Band
 The Game – Sham 69
 Getting a Head – Bob Ostertag
 Gideon – Kenny Rogers 
 Glass House Rock – Greg Kihn
 Good News – Sweet Honey in the Rock
 Gravity – Fred Frith
 Greatest Hits – Rita Coolidge
 Gyrate – Pylon
 Hail H.I.M. – Burning Spear
 Hanx – Stiff Little Fingers
 Happy Woman Blues – Lucinda Williams
 Heathen Earth – Throbbing Gristle 
 Hideaway – David Sanborn
 Hold On – Carolyne Mas
 Humans – Bruce Cockburn
 I Believe – The Buzzcocks
 Ikite Itemo Iidesuka – Miyuki Nakajima
 Immer nur träumen – Die Flippers
 In Concert, Zürich October 28, 1979 – Chick Corea and Gary Burton
 Inside Job – Dion DiMucci
 Inside My Brain – Angry Samoans
 The Inside Story – Robben Ford
 Invasion – Manilla Road 
 Iron Curtain Innocence – Bobb Trimble
 It's What's Inside That Counts – Critical Mass
 Jack Rabbit! – Doug Dillard
 Jane from Occupied Europe – Swell Maps
 Jazziz – John Serry, Jr.
 The Jealous Kind – Delbert McClinton
 Joy and Pain – Maze featuring Frankie Beverly
 Just Like That – Toots & the Maytals
 Kano – Kano
 Keeping Our Love Warm – Captain & Tennille
 Little Stevie Orbit – Steve Forbert
 ...Live... – Klaus Schulze – Live
 Live at Last – Good Rats
 Live at the North Sea Jazz Festival, 1980 – Oscar Peterson
 Live in der Balver Höhle – Piirpauke
 Live in Vienna – Cluster & Farnbauer
 Living Dub Vol. 2 – Burning Spear
 LKJ in Dub – Linton Kwesi Johnson
 The Long Riders – Ry Cooder
 Looking at Bird – Archie Shepp
 The Lord Will Make a Way – Al Green

 Lose It Tonight – Commander Cody and His Lost Planet Airmen
 Love Crimes – Harlequin
 Love in Exile – Eddy Grant
 Love Lives Forever – Minnie Riperton
 Maestra Vida: Primera Parte – Ruben Blades
 Make a Little Magic – Nitty Gritty Dirt Band
 Me Myself I – Joan Armatrading
 Mekons – The Mekons
 Memento z banalnym tryptykiem – SBB
 Michael Franks with Crossfire Live – Michael Franks
 Merzbild Schwet – Nurse With Wound
 Ming – David Murray Octet
 Monster – Herbie Hancock
 Music of Many Colors – Fela Kuti with Roy Ayers
 A Musical Affair – Ashford and Simpson
 My Babe – Roy Buchanan
 Never Alone – Amy Grant
 New Hope for the Wretched – Plasmatics
 Night Passage – Weather Report
 Now We May Begin – Randy Crawford
 Nurds – The Roches
 Official Secrets Act – M
 One Bad Habit – Michael Franks
 Operation Radication – Yellowman
 Ori Mi Ja Fun Mi – King Sunny Ade
 Paranoid Time (EP) – Minutemen
 Paul Davis – Paul Davis
 Penguin Eggs – Nic Jones
 People – James Brown
 Permanent Wave – John Hartford, The Dillards
 The Personal Touch – Oscar Peterson
 Play – Magazine
 Play Me or Trade Me – Parlet
 Popo – Art Pepper and Shorty Rogers
 Pucker Up – Lipps Inc. 
 Quintet '80 – David Grisman
 Rastakraut Pasta – Moebius & Plank
 Real Eyes – Gil Scott Heron
 Red Exposure – Chrome
 Reflections – Chet Atkins
 Répression – Trust
 Roky Erickson and the Aliens – Roky Erickson and the Aliens
 Running for My Life – Judy Collins
 Sails of Silver – Steeleye Span
 San Antonio Blues – Willie Nelson with Ray Price
 Selbstportrait – Vol. II – Hans-Joachim Roedelius
 Selbstportrait Vol. III "Reise durch Arcadien" – Hans-Joachim Roedelius
 Snap Crackle and Bop – John Cooper Clarke
 Sneak Me In – Lucifer's Friend
 Social Studies – Carla Bley
 Snockgrass – Michael Hurley 
 Something Better Change – D.O.A.
 Soul Syndrome – James Brown
 Spellbound – Dennis Brown
 Storm Windows – John Prine
 Strange Boutique – The Monochrome Set
 Sweat Band – Sweat Band
 Take It Easy Baby – Buckwheat Zydeco
 Tears and Laughter – Johnny Mathis
 Tennis – Chris Rea
 This Ain't Hollywood – DeGarmo and Key
 This Time – Al Jarreau
 To the Quiet Men from a Tiny Girl – Nurse With Wound
 Touch – Touch
 Trilogy: Past Present Future – Frank Sinatra
 Truth Decay – T-Bone Burnett
 Two – GQ
 Two Bit Monsters – John Hiatt
 Two Miles from Heaven – Mott the Hoople – Compilation
 Universal Juveniles – Max Webster 
 The Unknown Soldier – Roy Harper
 Up-Front – The Fleshtones
 Wall of Voodoo – Wall of Voodoo
 We Are...Every One of Us – Sweet Honey in the Rock
 When Two Worlds Collide – Jerry Lee Lewis
 Who's Been Talking – The Robert Cray Band
 Young and Restless – Prism
 You and Me at Home – John Hartford
 Your Cassette Pet – Bow Wow Wow
 Zydeco Gris Gris – BeauSoleil

Awards
BBC Young Musician of the Year: Nicholas Daniel, oboist
Boy Edgar Award: Rein de Graaff
1980 Country Music Association Awards
Eurovision Song Contest 1980
Grammy Awards of 1980
Harriet Cohen International Music Award

Biggest hit singles
The following songs achieved the highest chart positions
in the charts of 1980.

US and UK #1 hit singles
(in chronological order)

Top 40 Chart hit singles

Other Chart hit singles

Notable singles

Other notable singles

Classical music
George Crumb – A Little Suite for Christmas, A.D. 1979, for piano
Mario DavidovskyConsorts, for symphonic band
String Quartet No. 4
Peter Maxwell DaviesFarewell to Stromness (interlude from The Yellow Cake Review), for piano, Op. 89, No. 1
Symphony No. 2, Op. 91A Welcome to Orkney, for ensemble, Op. 90The Yellow Cake Revue, for singer or reciter and piano, Op. 88Yesnaby Ground (interlude from The Yellow Cake Review), for piano, Op. 89, No. 2
Sofia Gubaidulina – Offertorium («Жертвоприношение»), concerto for violin and orchestra
Helmut Lachenmann – Ein Kinderspiel, seven little pieces for piano
Trygve Madsen – Sonata for Tuba and Piano
Arvo Pärt – De profundis, for accompanied chorus; first performance 1981
Krzysztof Penderecki – Symphony No. 2: "Christmas"'
Simeon ten HoltNatalon in E for pianoBi-Ba-Bo for vocal quartet

Opera

Peter Maxwell Davies – Cinderella (children's opera)
Lorenzo Ferrero – MarilynPhilip Glass – SatyagrahaKirke Mechem – TartuffeWilliam Mathias – The Servants (libretto by Iris Murdoch)
Karlheinz Stockhausen – Donnerstag aus LichtMieczysław Weinberg – The PortraitJazz

Musical theater
 Barnum – Broadway production opened at the St. James Theatre on April 30 and ran for 854 performances
 Brigadoon (Lerner & Loewe) – Broadway revival opened at the Majestic Theatre on October 16 and ran for 133 performances
 Camelot (Lerner & Loewe) – Broadway revival opened at the New York State Theater on July 8 and ran for 56 performances
 Colette –  London production opened at the Comedy Theatre on September 24 and ran for 47 performances
 A Day in Hollywood/A Night in the Ukraine – Broadway production opened at the John Golden Theatre on April 2 and transferred to the Royale Theatre on June 17 for a total run of 588 performances
 Forty-Second Street – Broadway production opened at the Winter Garden Theatre on August 25, transferred to the Majestic Theatre on March 30, 1981, and transferred to the St. James Theatre on April 7, 1987, for a total run of 3486 performances
 The Life and Adventures Of Nicholas Nickleby – London production opened at the Aldwych Theatre on June 5
 On The Twentieth Century – London production opened at Her Majesty's Theatre on March 19 and ran for 165 performances
 Sweeney Todd (Stephen Sondheim) – London production opened at the Drury Lane Theatre on July 2 and ran for 157 performancesThe Umbrellas Of Cherbourg London production opened at the Phoenix Theatre on April 10
 West Side Story (Leonard Bernstein) – Broadway revival opened at the Minskoff Theatre on February 14 and ran for 333 performances

Musical films
 The Blues Brothers Can't Stop the Music Fame The Idolmaker The Jazz Singer Kallukkul Eeram La boum One Trick Pony Popeye Qurbani Ram Balram Times Square Xanadu''

Births
January 14 – Hiroshi Tamaki, Japanese actor, model, and singer
January 16 – Lin-Manuel Miranda, American playwright, singer, songwriter, rapper and composer
January 17 – Zooey Deschanel,  American actress and singer-songwriter.
January 18 – Estelle (musician), British singer, songwriter, rapper, record producer, and actress
January 21 – Nana Mizuki, Japanese voice actress and singer
January 28 
Nick Carter, American singer, actor and musician (Backstreet Boys)
Brian Fallon, American singer-songwriter and guitarist 
January 30 
Wilmer Valderrama, American actor, singer, producer and television personality (Demi Lovato, Mandy Moore) 
 Josh Kelley, American musician
February 3 – Sarah Lewitinn, American record producer and journalist
February 5 – Tiwa Savage, Nigerian singer
February 7 – William Tell (musician), rhythm guitarist and backing vocalist for the piano rock band Something Corporate. 
February 15 – Conor Oberst, American singer-songwriter (Bright Eyes)
February 17 – Vahe Tilbian, Ethiopian singer
 February 18
 Cezar, Romanian opera singer and pianist
 Regina Spektor, Russian-American singer-songwriter
February 22 
 Shamari Fears, American singer-songwriter and actress (Blaque)
 Kang Sung-hoon, South Korean singer 
February 27 – Cyrus Bolooki, (New Found Glory) 
February 26 – Alex Fong Lik-Sun, Hong Kong singer and actor
March 2 
Vince Walker, American rock singer (Suburban Legends)
 Rebel Wilson, Australian actress, writer, comedienne, singer and producer
March 8 – Charli Robinson, Australian actress, singer and dancer 
March 13 – Flavia Cacace, Italian dancer
March 19 – Agnes Pihlava, Finnish pop singer
March 20 – Mikk Murdvee, violinist and conductor
March 21 – Deryck Whibley, Canadian musician and producer (Sum 41) (Avril Lavigne) 
March 22 – Shannon Bex,  American singer, reality show personality, professional dancer (Danity Kane. Dumblonde)
March 27 – Tai Orathai, Luk Thung singer
March 28 – Rasmus Seebach, Danish singer-songwriter and record producer
March 30 – Yalin, Turkish pop singer and songwriter
March 31 – Maaya Sakamoto, Japanese singer
April 10 – Bryce Soderberg, Canadian musician (Lifehouse)
April 12 – Brian McFadden, Irish (Was part of Westlife)
April 14 – Win Butler, American/Canadian musician
April 15 – Patrick Carney, American musician and producer (The Black Keys) (Michelle Branch) 
April 16 – Jake Andrews, American singer-songwriter and guitarist
April 24 – Danny Gokey, American Idol season 8 finalist
April 26 – Channing Tatum, American dancer, performer and actor (Jessie J, Jenna Dewan) 
April 29 – Kian Egan (Westlife)
May 3 – Souleye (hip hop artist), American rapper and hip hop artist (Bassnectar, BLVD, Alanis Morissette)
May 5 – Maia Hirasawa, Swedish pop singer 
 Hank Green, American singer, songwriter, educator, blogger, entrepreneur and author.
May 6 – Taebin, Korean hip-hop artist (1TYM)
10 May - Madeleine Sami,  New Zealand actress, comedian, movie producer and musician.
May 12 – Romina Arena, Italian-American singer-songwriter
May 16 – Harmony Samuels,  English record producer, composer and songwriter.
May 17 – Ariën van Weesenbeek,  Dutch drummer, screamer, keyboardist, percussion (Epica, MaYaN) 
May 21 
 Gotye, Australian multi-instrumental musician and singer-songwriter (Kimbra) 
 Anika Moa, New Zealand recording artist, activist and television presenter
May 28 
 Mark Feehily (Westlife)
 Lindi Ortega,  Canadian country singer-songwriter
May 31 – Andy Hurley, American drummer (Fall Out Boy and The Damned Things)
June 2 – Orish Grinstead, American R&B singer (died 2008)
June 5 – Brandi Shearer, American singer-songwriter
June 6 – Peter Mosely, American bass player (Yellowcard and Inspection 12)
June 7 – Henkka Seppälä, Finnish bassist (Children of Bodom)
June 13 – Sarah Connor, German singer
June 16 – Joey Yung, Hong Kong singer
June 17 – Kimeru, Japanese singer
June 18 – Colin Munroe, Canadian singer-songwriter and producer 
June 20 – Tony Lovato (Mest)
June 23 – Jessica Taylor, English singer, television personality, and dancer (Liberty X)
June 26 – Jason Schwartzman (Phantom Planet)
June 27 – Jennifer Goodridge, American keyboard player (Your Enemies Friends)
June 29 – Katherine Jenkins, Welsh soprano
 July 2 – Ciara Sotto, Filipina singer and actress
July 3 – Kid Sister, American rapper
July 5 
Pauly D, American DJ (Britney Spears) 
Mads Tolling, Danish-American violinist and composer (Turtle Island Quartet)
July 10 – Jessica Simpson, American singer-songwriter, designer and actress
July 11 – Jenny Hval, Norwegian singer-songwriter, record producer and musician. 
July 13 
 Corey Clark, American singer
 Emile Haynie, American record producer (Lana Del Rey, Bruno Mars, Dua Lipa, Florence Welch)
July 15 – JW-Jones, Canadian blues artist
July 17 – Kaya (Japanese musician),  Japanese visual kei musician, EDM artist
July 18 – Kristen Bell, American actress, vocal actress and singer
July 19 – Michelle Heaton, English pop singer, actress, television personality and personal trainer. (Liberty X)
July 20 
 Dado Dolabella, Brazilian actor and singer
 Mike Kennerty (The All-American Rejects)
July 21 – Really Doe, American rapper
July 22 
 Kate Ryan, Belgian singer-songwriter 
 Tablo, South Korean-Canadian rapper, songwriter, record producer, and author
July 23 – Michelle Williams, Gospel singer-songwriter (Destiny's Child)
July 25 = Diam's, French rapper and singer of Greek Cypriot origin. 
July 5 – Rebeka Dremelj, Slovenian singer
July 26 – Dave Baksh (Sum 41)
July 28
Stephen Christian, American Christian rock singer (Anberlin)
Noel Sullivan, Welsh singer (Hear'Say) and actor
July 30 – Diam's, French rapper
August 12
Matt Thiessen, Canadian singer/guitarist
Jade Villalon, American singer-songwriter, pianist, and actress (Sweetbox)
August 16
Vanessa Carlton, American singer-songwriter, musician
Øystein Moen,  Norwegian pianist and composer (Puma and Jaga Jazzist)
August 17 – Lene Marlin, Norwegian singer and musician
August 19
Houcine Camara, French singer
Darius Danesh, Scottish singer-songwriter & actor
 August 20 - Mayra Veronica, American singer, model, actress and television personality 
August 26 – Macaulay Culkin, American actor, author, painter, podcaster, musician and president of Bunnyears
August 29 – Richa Sharma, playback singer
August 30 – Alicia Warrington, American drummer (Lillix) 
August 31 – Joe Budden, American rapper  
September 5 – Kevin Simm, English singer (Liberty X)
September 6 – Kerry Katona, English singer, author, model (Atomic Kitten)
September 11 – Mikey Way, bassist of My Chemical Romance
September 13 – Teppei Teranishi (Thrice)
September 14 – Ayọ, Nigerian-German singer-songwriter and actress
September 15 - Jolin Tsai, a Taiwanese singer, songwriter, and actress. 
September 19 – Tegan and Sara Quin (Tegan And Sara), Canadian singer-songwriters, musicians, multi-instrumentalists
September 24 – Homeboy Sandman, American rapper
September 25 – T.I., American rapper
September 29 
 Dallas Green (musician), Canadian singer/songwriter
 Zachary Levi, American actor, singer and comedian 
October 5 – Paul Thomas (Good Charlotte)
October 8 – Nick Cannon, American actor and rapper
October 10 – Sherine, Egyptian singer
October 12 – Soledad Pastorutti, Argentine folklore singer and The Voice coach
October 13 – Ashanti, American singer-songwriter, actress, dancer
October 15 – Siiri Nordin, Finnish singer-songwriter 
October 24
Kaushiki Chakraborty, Indian classical vocalist
Monica, American singer, songwriter, producer and actress
October 27 – Tanel Padar, Estonian singer-songwriter and guitarist
October 31 – Isabella Summers, English musician, songwriter, producer, remixer, DJ (Florence and the Machine).
November 3 – Dan Marsala, American musician
November 5 – Essaï Altounian, French-Armenian actor, singer-songwriter, keyboardist and music producer
November 7 – Karthik, playback singer
November 10 – Calvin Chen, Taiwanese pop singer
November 12 – Shaun Cooper, American bass player 
November 14 – Matt Brann, Canadian drummer
November 15 – Ace Young, American singer and reality show finalist
November 17 – Isaac Hanson (Hanson)
November 18 – Dustin Kensrue (Thrice)
November 26 – Satoshi Ohno, Japanese singer
November 28 – Lisa Middelhauve, German singer (Xandria)
November 29 – Janina Gavankar, American musician and actress
December 1 – Roger Peterson, Aruban-Dutch singer-songwriter 
December 3 – Jenna Dewan, American dancer, performer, business woman, choreographer, producer, actor and television host
December 5 – Ibrahim Maalouf, trumpeter
December 6 – Kei Yasuda, Japanese singer
December 8 – Kate Voegele,  American singer-songwriter and actress
December 9 – Simon Helberg, American actor, comedian, singer and pianist 
December 10
Sarah Chang,  American classical violinist
Chris Gaynor (The All-American Rejects)
December 14 – Tata Young, Thai-American singer and actress
December 16 – Axle Whitehead, Australian singer, musician, TV host and actor
December 18 – Christina Aguilera, American R&B-Soul singer-songwriter
December 19 – Verbal Jint, South Korean musician, rapper and record producer
December 20 – Yangwei Linghua, Chinese singer, member of Phoenix Legend
December 24 – Tomas Kalnoky, American musician (Streetlight Manifesto)
December 25 – Park Ji-young, South Korean singer, dancer and actress, former leader of After School

Deaths
January 1 – Adolph Deutsch (82), American composer
January 2 – J. Mayo Williams (85), African American blues music producer
January 3 – Amos Milburn (52), African American R&B singer and pianist
January 6
Poley McClintock, jazz musician
Georgeanna Tillman (36), pop and R&B singer
January 7 – Larry Williams (44), singer, songwriter and pianist
January 13 – Andre Kostelanetz (78), Russian-born conductor and arranger
January 21 – Elvira de Hidalgo (88), coloratura soprano and singing teacher
January 29
Jimmy Durante (86), pianist & entertainer
Edward Lewis (79), founder of Decca Records
January 30 – Professor Longhair (61), pianist
February 17 – Jerry Fielding (57), American conductor and music director (heart failure)
February 18 
Muriel Brunskill (80), British contralto
Gale Robbins (58), American singer and actress (lung cancer)
February 19 – Bon Scott (33), lead singer of AC/DC (acute alcohol poisoning)
February 28 – Dinorá de Carvalho (75), Brazilian pianist, conductor and composer
March 5 – Winifred Wagner (82), daughter-in-law of Richard Wagner, close friend of Adolf Hitler (born 1897)
March 14 – Anna Jantar (29), Polish singer (air crash)
March 18 – Jessica Dragonette (80), American singer
March 23 – Jacob Miller (27), reggae artist
March 25 – Walter Susskind (66), Czech conductor
March 26
Jon Paulus (32), the Buckinghams, drug overdose
Ted Shapiro (80), songwriter & pianist
March 28 – Dick Haymes, (63), Argentinian-born US singer and actor
March 29 – Mantovani (74), Italian-born British orchestra leader and composer
April 4 – Red Sovine (62), American country & folk singer & songwriter
April 20 – Katherine Kennicott Davis (87), American composer
April 22 – Jane Froman (72), American singer and actress
April 28 – Tommy Caldwell (30), bassist of Marshall Tucker Band (car accident)
May 4 – Joe "Mr Piano" Henderson (60), pianist (heart attack)
May 18 – Ian Curtis (23), lead singer of Joy Division (suicide)
May 30 – Carl Radle (37), rock bassist
June 11 – Bolesław Woytowicz (80), Polish pianist and composer
June 16 – Bob Nolan (72), country singer and songwriter
June 20 – Allan Pettersson (68), Swedish composer
June 21 – Bert Kaempfert (56), German composer, bandleader and arranger (stroke)
June 27 – Barney Bigard (74), jazz clarinetist
June 28 – José Iturbi (84), pianist
July 5 – A. J. Potter (72), Irish composer
July 9 – Vinicius de Moraes (66), Brazilian lyricist and composer 
July 14 – Malcolm Owen (26), Lead singer The Ruts (overdose)
July 15 – Ben Selvin (82), "The Dean of Recorded Music"
July 23 – Keith Godchaux (32), keyboardist with Grateful Dead (car accident)
July 25 – Vladimir Vysotsky (42), Russian singer-songwriter, poet, actor (heart failure)
July 31 – Mohammed Rafi (55), Indian singer (heart attack)
August 5 - George Scott III (26), American No Wave bassist for Contortions and John Cale, heroin overdose
August 11 – Jacques Singer (70), conductor
August 17 – Harold Adamson (73), lyricist
August 18 – John Sebastian (66), harmonica virtuoso
August 20 – Joe Dassin (41), singer (heart attack)
August 22 – Cosmé McMoon (79), pianist and composer
August 26 – Miliza Korjus (71), Estonian-Polish opera singer
September 2 – Marcel Ciampi (89), French pianist and teacher
September 7 – Arvella Gray (74), blues and folk singer and guitarist
September 12 – Lillian Randolph (81), actress and singer
September 15 – Bill Evans (51), jazz pianist
September 16 – Ludmila Červinková (72), operatic soprano
September 17 – Waldemar Seidel (87), Australian pianist
September 18 – Walter Midgley (67), English operatic tenor
September 25 – John Bonham (32), drummer (Led Zeppelin) (pulmonary aspiration)
September 30 – Horace Finch (74), pianist and organist
October 3 – Jerzy Żurawlew (93), pianist, conductor, teacher, and founder of the International Chopin Piano Competition.
October 25 – Virgil Fox (68), organist (cancer)
October 27 – Steve Peregrin Took (31), bongo player for Tyrannosaurus Rex later a solo artist/frontman (asphyxiation)
November 15 – Bill Lee (64), American actor and playback singer 
December 7 – Darby Crash (22), singer of the (Germs) (suicide)
December 8 – John Lennon (40), singer, guitarist and songwriter (The Beatles) (murdered)
December 24 – Siggie Nordstrom (87), American model, actress, entertainer, socialite and lead singer (The Nordstrom Sisters)
December 29 – Tim Hardin (39), singer-songwriter (heroin overdose)
December 31 – Robert Pete Williams (66), blues singer and guitarist

Notes

References

 
20th century in music
Music by year